Frans Decker (1684 – 1751) was an 18th-century painter from the Northern Netherlands.

Biography
Decker was born in 1684.

He was a painter whose pictures possess great merit, and are to be met with in almost every collection. He is stated to have been born at Haarlem in 1684, and to have died at the same place in 1751, having been a pupil of Romeyn De Hooghe and of Bartholomeus Engels. He painted landscapes in a very pleasing and natural style, resembling the charming productions of Ruisdael, but without the
servility of an imitator. He also excelled in caricature.

He was a member of the Haarlem Guild of St. Luke from 1706 until his death. His pupils were Cornelis van den Berg, Tako Hajo Jelgersma, and Cornelis van Noorde. His portrait was engraved by his pupil Jelgersma.

Decker died in 1751, in Haarlem.

Notes

References

Attribution:
 

1684 births
1751 deaths
18th-century Dutch painters
18th-century Dutch male artists
Dutch male painters
Artists from Haarlem
Painters from Haarlem